The 1871 Wisconsin gubernatorial election was held on November 7, 1871. Republican Cadwallader C. Washburn was elected with 53% of the vote, defeating Democratic candidate James Rood Doolittle. Incumbent Governor Lucius Fairchild did not seek re-election.

Both major party candidates in this election had served as delegates to the Peace Conference of 1861 which attempted to avert the American Civil War.

Democratic Party
James Rood Doolittle had served twelve years as a Republican United States Senator before becoming the Democratic Party's nominee for Governor in the 1871 election.  Prior to his service in the U.S. Senate, Doolittle had been a Wisconsin Circuit Court Judge.

Republican Party
Cadwallader C. Washburn had just left office as Congressman for Wisconsin's 6th congressional district, having served a total of ten years in the United States House of Representatives.  Between his years in Congress, Washburn had served as a Union Army general in the Civil War under Ulysses S. Grant.

Results

| colspan="6" style="text-align:center;background-color: #e9e9e9;"| General Election, November 7, 1871

References

1871
Wisconsin
1871 Wisconsin elections